An Emergency Data Request is a procedure used by U.S. law enforcement agencies for obtaining information from service providers in emergency situations where there is not time to get a subpoena. In 2022, Brian Krebs reported that Emergency Data Requests were being spoofed by hackers to obtain confidential information.

There have been proposals to secure emergency data requests using digital signatures, but this would require substantial technical and legal effort to implement.

References 

Security engineering
Social engineering (computer security)
Cybercrime